Visa requirements for Montenegrin citizens are administrative entry restrictions imposed by the authorities of foreign states on citizens of Montenegro.  Montenegrin citizens had visa-free or visa on arrival access (including eTAs) to 124 countries and territories, ranking the Montenegrin passport 46th in the world in terms of travel freedom (tied with the Kiribati passport) according to the Henley Passport Index.



Visa requirements map

Visa requirements

Dependent, disputed or restricted territories
Visa requirements for Montenegrin citizens for visits to various territories, disputed areas and restricted zones:

See also

Visa policy of Montenegro
Montenegrin passport
Montenegrin identity card
List of passports
Foreign relations of Montenegro

References and Notes
References

Notes

External links
Ministry of Foreign Affairs

Montenegro
Foreign relations of Montenegro